Job Carr (July 2, 1813 - August 10, 1887) was the founder of Tacoma, Washington, United States.

A Union veteran of the United States Civil War, Carr came west in 1864 to settle on a 168-acre claim in what is now Tacoma.

Carr was the first permanent European American settler in the area. He built a cabin on his claim, which doubled as the United States Post Office when Carr was appointed Postmaster. He was an early promoter of Tacoma as a potential terminus for the Northern Pacific Railroad, and encouraged settlement in the new town.

A replica of his original cabin stands near the original location, and serves as a museum of both Carr and of early Tacoma.

References

External links
Job Carr arrives at future site of Tacoma
Job Carr Cabin Museum

1813 births
1887 deaths
People from Tacoma, Washington